St. Louis Assembly Plant was an automobile factory owned by Ford Motor Company in Hazelwood, Missouri. It was opened in 1948 and was closed in 2006; it was idled as part of Ford's "The Way Forward" plan. The plant was demolished in 2009.

Product lines at closure
 Ford Explorer
 Lincoln Aviator
 Mercury Mountaineer

Historical products
 Ford Aerostar (1986–1997)
 Mercury Grand Marquis (1983–1985)
 Ford LTD Crown Victoria (1983–1985)
 Mercury Marquis (1967–1982)
 Mercury Monterey (through 1974)
 Mercury Marauder (1963–1965, 1969–1970)
 Mercury Park Lane
 Mercury Montclair
 Mercury Eight
 Ford Galaxie
 Ford LTD

See also
 List of Ford factories

External links
 The History of Ford Motor Company in St. Louis, Missouri

Ford factories
Former motor vehicle assembly plants
Motor vehicle assembly plants in Missouri
Buildings and structures in St. Louis County, Missouri
1948 establishments in Missouri
2006 disestablishments in Missouri
Buildings and structures demolished in 2009
Industrial buildings completed in 1948